Robert Patrick Barrett (born November 18, 1935) was an American football offensive end in the American Football League for the Buffalo Bills in 1960.  He played college football at Baldwin-Wallace College.

See also
List of American Football League players

1935 births
Living people
American football wide receivers
Baldwin Wallace Yellow Jackets football players
Buffalo Bills players
Players of American football from Cleveland
American Football League players